Ali Osman Khan (1946/7 – 2 July 2021) was a Bangladesh Nationalist Party politician and the former Member of Parliament of Mymensingh-17 (present Netrokona-3).

Career
Khan was elected to parliament from Mymensingh-17 as a Bangladesh Nationalist Party candidate in 1979.

Death 
Khan died on 2 July 2021 at Bangladesh Medical College Hospital, Dhaka.

References

1940s births
2021 deaths
Bangladesh Nationalist Party politicians
2nd Jatiya Sangsad members